Paradise (named Big Fun in the US) is the debut album by Detroit-based electronic music duo Inner City, released in 1989. The album was a great success in the UK and in US clubs, and was one of the first techno albums to cross over to the mainstream charts, particularly in Europe.  Group member Kevin Saunderson (along with Juan Atkins, who produced one track) is renowned as one of the originators the Detroit techno sound. The vocals on Paradise were performed by the group's other member, Paris Grey.

The album was retitled Big Fun for its US release, and the ballad "Power of Passion" was replaced with "Whatcha Gonna Do with My Lovin'" when that song became popular in the US. The original US pressing, however, contains the former.

A top-three success in the UK, Paradise spun off four top-twenty singles (three of which hit the UK top ten). The first four singles released from the album topped the US Hot Dance Club Play chart. A remix album featuring songs from Paradise was released in the UK later in 1989.

Track listing 
All songs produced by Saunderson, except for “And I Do,” produced by Atkins.

Paradise/Big Fun
"Inner City Theme" (K. Saunderson) — 2:50
"Paradise" (K. Saunderson, A. Saunderson, P. Grey) — 4:05
"Ain't Nobody Better" (K. Saunderson, P. Grey) — 4:01
"Power of Passion" (K. Saunderson, P. Grey) — 5:00
"Big Fun" (K. Saunderson, P. Grey, J. Pennington, A. Forrest) — 3:25
"Do You Love What You Feel" (K. Saunderson, P. Grey) — 5:01
"Good Life" (K. Saunderson, P. Grey, R. Holmon) — 4:05
"Set Your Body Free" (K. Saunderson, A. Saunderson, C. Damier) — 4:01
"And I Do" (J. Atkins, P. Grey) — 4:09
"Secrets of the Mind" (K. Saunderson, P. Grey) — 4:55
"Whatcha Gonna Do with My Lovin'" (R. Lucas, J. Mtume) — 4:14 (Radio Mix)  (Japan only bonus track)
"Whatcha Gonna Do With My Lovin'" (R. Lucas, J. Mtume) — 8:28 (Def Mix)  (Japan only bonus track)

Big Fun (second pressing)
"Inner City Theme" (K. Saunderson) — 2:50
"Paradise" (K. Saunderson, A. Saunderson, P. Grey) — 4:05
"Ain't Nobody Better" (K. Saunderson, P. Grey) — 4:01
"Whatcha Gonna Do With My Lovin'" (R. Lucas, J. Mtume) — 4:15
"Big Fun" (K. Saunderson, P. Grey, J. Pennington, A. Forrest) — 3:25
"Do You Love What You Feel" (K. Saunderson, P. Grey) — 5:01
"Good Life" (K. Saunderson, P. Grey, R. Holmon) — 4:04
"Set Your Body Free" (K. Saunderson, A. Saunderson, C. Damier) — 4:01
"And I Do" (J. Atkins, P. Grey) — 4:09
"Secrets of the Mind" (K. Saunderson, P. Grey) — 4:55

Charts

Singles
1988 "Big Fun", #8 UK, #1 U.S. Dance
1988 "Good Life", #4 UK, #73 U.S., #1 U.S. Dance
1989 "Ain't Nobody Better", #10 UK, #1 U.S. Dance
1989 "Do You Love What You Feel", #16 UK, #1 U.S. Dance
1989 "Whatcha Gonna Do with My Lovin'", #12 UK, U.S. #76, #8 U.S. Dance

References

1989 debut albums
Inner City (band) albums
Virgin Records albums